Astolfo Romero (born 15 December 1957) is a Colombian footballer. He competed in the men's tournament at the 1980 Summer Olympics.

References

External links
 

1957 births
Living people
Colombian footballers
Colombia international footballers
Olympic footballers of Colombia
Footballers at the 1980 Summer Olympics
People from Buenaventura, Valle del Cauca
Association football defenders
Sportspeople from Valle del Cauca Department